The following is a partial list of the "G" codes for Medical Subject Headings (MeSH), as defined by the United States National Library of Medicine (NLM).

This list continues the information at List of MeSH codes (G13). Codes following these are found at List of MeSH codes (H01). For other MeSH codes, see List of MeSH codes.

The source for this content is the set of 2006 MeSH Trees from the NLM.

– genetic structures

– base sequence

– at rich sequence

– gc rich sequence
  – cpg islands

– matrix attachment regions

– regulatory sequences, nucleic acid
  – enhancer elements (genetics)
  – e-box elements
  – hiv enhancer
  – response elements
  – serum response element
  – vitamin d response element
  – insulator elements
  – locus control region
  – operator regions (genetics)
  – promoter regions (genetics)
  – response elements
  – serum response element
  – vitamin d response element
  – TATA box
  – regulatory sequences, ribonucleic acid
  – rna 3' polyadenylation signals
  – rna splice sites
  – rna 5' terminal oligopyrimidine sequence
  – silencer elements, transcriptional
  – terminator regions (genetics)

– repetitive sequences, nucleic acid
  – interspersed repetitive sequences
  – dna transposable elements
  – genomic islands
  – retroelements
  – endogenous retroviruses
  – genes, intracisternal a-particle
  – long interspersed nucleotide elements
  – short interspersed nucleotide elements
  – alu elements
  – tandem repeat sequences
  – dna repeat expansion
  – trinucleotide repeat expansion
  – dna, satellite
  – microsatellite repeats
  – dinucleotide repeats
  – trinucleotide repeats
  – trinucleotide repeat expansion
  – minisatellite repeats
  – terminal repeat sequences
  – hiv long terminal repeat
  – hiv enhancer

– chromosome structures

– centromere
  – kinetochores

– chromatids

– chromatin
  – euchromatin
  – heterochromatin
  – sex chromatin
  – nucleosomes

– nucleolus organizer region

– synaptonemal complex

– telomere

– chromosomes

– chromosomes, archaeal

– chromosomes, artificial
  – chromosomes, artificial, bacterial
  – chromosomes, artificial, mammalian
  – chromosomes, artificial, human
  – chromosomes, artificial, p1 bacteriophage
  – chromosomes, artificial, yeast

– chromosomes, bacterial
  – chromosomes, artificial, bacterial

– chromosomes, fungal
  – chromosomes, artificial, yeast

– chromosomes, mammalian
  – chromosomes, artificial, mammalian
  – chromosomes, artificial, human
  – chromosomes, human
  – chromosomes, artificial, human
  – chromosomes, human, 1-3
  – chromosomes, human, pair 1
  – chromosomes, human, pair 2
  – chromosomes, human, pair 3
  – chromosomes, human, 4-5
  – chromosomes, human, pair 4
  – chromosomes, human, pair 5
  – chromosomes, human, 6-12 and x
  – chromosomes, human, pair 6
  – chromosomes, human, pair 7
  – chromosomes, human, pair 8
  – chromosomes, human, pair 9
  – philadelphia chromosome
  – chromosomes, human, pair 10
  – chromosomes, human, pair 11
  – chromosomes, human, pair 12
  – chromosomes, human, x
  – chromosomes, human, 13-15
  – chromosomes, human, pair 13
  – chromosomes, human, pair 14
  – chromosomes, human, pair 15
  – chromosomes, human, 16-18
  – chromosomes, human, pair 16
  – chromosomes, human, pair 17
  – chromosomes, human, pair 18
  – chromosomes, human, 19-20
  – chromosomes, human, pair 19
  – chromosomes, human, pair 20
  – chromosomes, human, 21-22 and y
  – chromosomes, human, pair 21
  – chromosomes, human, pair 22
  – philadelphia chromosome
  – chromosomes, human, y

– chromosomes, plant

– isochromosomes

– ring chromosomes

– sex chromosomes
  – sex chromatin
  – x chromosome
  – chromosomes, human, x
  – y chromosome
  – chromosomes, human, y

– gene library

– genomic library

– peptide library

– genetic code

– anticodon

– codon
  – codon, initiator
  – codon, terminator
  – codon, nonsense

– reading frames
  – open reading frames

– genetic vectors

– chromosomes, artificial
  – chromosomes, artificial, bacterial
  – chromosomes, artificial, mammalian
  – chromosomes, artificial, human
  – chromosomes, artificial, p1 bacteriophage
  – chromosomes, artificial, yeast

– cosmids

– genome

– genome components
  – attachment sites, microbiological
  – cpg islands
  – dna sequence, unstable
  – dna repeat expansion
  – trinucleotide repeat expansion
  – chromosome fragile sites
  – dna, intergenic
  – dna, satellite
  – 3' flanking region
  – 5' flanking region
  – introns
  – replication origin
  – untranslated regions
  – 3' untranslated regions
  – 5' untranslated regions
  – genes
  – alleles
  – gene components
  – codon
  – codon, initiator
  – codon, terminator
  – exons
  – hinge exons
  – vdj exons
  – expressed sequence tags
  – 3' flanking region
  – 5' flanking region
  – immunoglobulin switch region
  – introns
  – open reading frames
  – regulatory elements, transcriptional
  – enhancer elements (genetics)
  – e-box elements
  – hiv enhancer
  – response elements
  – serum response element
  – vitamin d response element
  – promoter regions (genetics)
  – response elements
  – serum response element
  – vitamin d response element
  – TATA box
  – terminator regions (genetics)
  – transcription initiation site
  – rna 3' polyadenylation signals
  – rna splice sites
  – rna 5' terminal oligopyrimidine sequence
  – untranslated regions
  – 3' untranslated regions
  – 5' untranslated regions
  – genes, archaeal
  – genes, bacterial
  – genes, cdc
  – genes, developmental
  – genes, homeobox
  – genes, dominant
  – genes, duplicate
  – genes, essential
  – genes, fungal
  – genes, mating type, fungal
  – genes, helminth
  – genes, immediate-early
  – genes, immunoglobulin
  – genes, immunoglobulin heavy chain
  – hinge exons
  – immunoglobulin switch region
  – genes, immunoglobulin light chain
  – genes, insect
  – genes, lethal
  – genes, mdr
  – genes, mitochondrial
  – genes, neoplasm
  – genes, tumor suppressor
  – genes, apc
  – genes, brca1
  – genes, brca2
  – genes, dcc
  – genes, mcc
  – genes, neurofibromatosis 1
  – genes, neurofibromatosis 2
  – genes, p16
  – genes, p53
  – genes, retinoblastoma
  – genes, wilms tumor
  – oncogenes
  – proto-oncogenes
  – genes, abl
  – genes, bcl-1
  – genes, bcl-2
  – genes, erba
  – genes, erbb
  – genes, erbb-1
  – genes, erbb-2
  – genes, fms
  – genes, fos
  – genes, jun
  – genes, mos
  – genes, myb
  – genes, myc
  – genes, ras
  – genes, rel
  – genes, sis
  – genes, src
  – genes, overlapping
  – nested genes
  – genes, plant
  – genes, protozoan
  – genes, rag-1
  – genes, recessive
  – genes, tumor suppressor
  – genes, apc
  – genes, brca1
  – genes, brca2
  – genes, dcc
  – genes, mcc
  – genes, neurofibromatosis 1
  – genes, neurofibromatosis 2
  – genes, p16
  – genes, p53
  – genes, retinoblastoma
  – genes, wilms tumor
  – genes, regulator
  – genes, arac
  – genes, nef
  – genes, px
  – genes, rev
  – genes, switch
  – genes, tat
  – genes, vif
  – genes, vpr
  – genes, vpu
  – genes, reporter
  – genes, sry
  – genes, suppressor
  – genes, synthetic
  – genes, t-cell receptor
  – genes, t-cell receptor alpha
  – genes, t-cell receptor beta
  – genes, t-cell receptor delta
  – genes, t-cell receptor gamma
  – genes, viral
  – genes, env
  – genes, gag
  – genes, immediate-early
  – genes, intracisternal a-particle
  – genes, nef
  – genes, pol
  – genes, px
  – genes, rev
  – genes, tat
  – genes, vif
  – genes, vpr
  – genes, vpu
  – major histocompatibility complex
  – genes, mhc class i
  – genes, mhc class ii
  – minor histocompatibility loci
  – minor lymphocyte stimulatory loci
  – multigene family
  – genes, mdr
  – genes, rrna
  – pseudogenes
  – quantitative trait loci
  – transgenes
  – genes, transgenic, suicide
  – insulator elements
  – interspersed repetitive sequences
  – dna transposable elements
  – genomic islands
  – retroelements
  – endogenous retroviruses
  – genes, intracisternal a-particle
  – long interspersed nucleotide elements
  – short interspersed nucleotide elements
  – alu elements
  – isochores
  – locus control region
  – nucleolus organizer region
  – operon
  – lac operon
  – operator regions (genetics)
  – rrna operon
  – regulon
  – replicon
  – replication origin
  – sequence tagged sites
  – silencer elements, transcriptional
  – tandem repeat sequences
  – dna repeat expansion
  – dna, satellite
  – microsatellite repeats
  – dinucleotide repeats
  – trinucleotide repeats
  – trinucleotide repeat expansion
  – minisatellite repeats

– genome, archaeal
  – genes, archaeal

– genome, bacterial
  – genes, bacterial
  – operon
  – lac operon
  – operator regions (genetics)
  – rrna operon

– genome, fungal
  – genes, fungal
  – genes, mating type, fungal

– genome, helminth
  – genes, helminth

– genome, human

– genome, insect
  – genes, insect

– genome, plant
  – genes, plant

– genome, protozoan
  – genes, protozoan

– genome, viral
  – genes, viral
  – genes, env
  – genes, gag
  – genes, immediate-early
  – genes, intracisternal a-particle
  – genes, nef
  – genes, pol
  – genes, px
  – genes, rev
  – genes, tat
  – genes, vif
  – genes, vpr
  – genes, vpu

– genomic library

– histone code

– plasmids

– bacteriocin plasmids

– cosmids

– f factor

– hemolysin factors

– lactose factors

– plant tumor-inducing plasmids

– r factors

– templates, genetic

The list continues at List of MeSH codes (H01).

MeSH
G14